The Saudi Crown Prince's Cup was the Saudi Arabian annual cup competition. It was the oldest domestic football competition in Saudi Arabia, its first edition was held in 1956–57, but was not crowned from 1975 until 1990. The competition consists of teams from the top two tiers of Saudi league football (Professional League and First Division League), as well as the competition runs from August until February.

Al-Hilal has won the most titles with 13 wins, also Al-Hilal has contested more finals with 17. Al-Ittihad is the last champion being the winner of 2016–17 season.

Prize money
Prize money:

 Final winner: 2,500,000 Saudi Riyals.
 Final runners-up: 1,500,000 Saudi Riyals.

Finals

Source:

Performance by club

1including one title as Al-Thaghar

Source:

Alltime Top goalscorers

Hat-tricks

References

External links
 Current Crown Prince Cup tournament results at Soccerway
 Saudi Arabia Football Federation 
 Saudi Crown Prince Cup - Hailoosport.com

  
2
Saudi Arabia